Sweaty Betty is a British retailer specialising in women's activewear, founded by Tamara and Simon Hill-Norton. The brand was named after a song of the same name by British band the Macc Lads. It has over 50 boutiques in the United Kingdom, six boutiques in the United States and concessions in department stores Harrods and Bloomingdale's. In August 2021, Sweaty Betty was bought by American apparel manufacturer Wolverine Worldwide.

History
Sweaty Betty was founded in 1998 by Tamara and Simon Hill-Norton with one boutique in London's Notting Hill. By 2003, the company had expanded to five boutiques.

In 2006, Sweaty Betty opened their first concession in Selfridges and now feature in the in-store Body Studio – this was later followed by one in Harrods.

, there were over 40 Sweaty Betty boutiques around the UK, 6 in the US and 4 department store concessions as well as a British and American online store.

In 2019, Sweaty Betty's website was targeted by cyber-criminals, who inserted malicious code into its eCommerce website to capture customer card details during the checkout process.

In August 2021, Sweaty Betty was bought by publicly traded American apparel manufacturer Wolverine Worldwide for £300m. 

, there are 47 Sweaty Betty boutiques and 14 department store concessions in the UK. There are also 49 department store concessions in the U.S., and 17 boutiques and department store concessions in Canada, Germany, Hong Kong, Ireland, and Singapore.  There are also online stores for the British and American markets.

Awards
In 2001, Sweaty Betty was named Sports Industries Federation "sports retailer of the year".

In 2015, Sweaty Betty won an award for "Healthiest Employees" as part of Vitality Health Insurances' Britain's Healthiest Workplace Awards.

References

External links
Official website

Clothing retailers of the United Kingdom
Clothing companies established in 1998
Retail companies established in 1998
2021 mergers and acquisitions
Wolverine World Wide